Elżbieta Zawacka (19 March 1909 – 10 January 2009), known also by her war-time nom de guerre Zo, was a Polish university professor, scouting instructor, SOE agent and a freedom fighter during World War II. She was promoted to brigadier general of the Polish Army (the second woman in the history of the Polish Army to hold this rank) by President Lech Kaczyński on 3 May 2006. Sometimes called "the only woman among the Cichociemni", she served as a courier for the Home Army, carrying letters and other documents from Nazi-occupied Poland to the Polish government in exile in London and back. Her regular route ran from Warsaw through Berlin and Sweden to London. She was also responsible for organizing routes for other couriers of the Home Army.

Biography
Elżbieta Zawacka was born in Toruń (in German, Thorn), part of the Prussian Partition of Poland, and graduated from Poznań University in mathematics. When she was 10 years old, in 1919, her city, Toruń, returned to reborn Poland, which regained independence in 1918. She passed her high school diploma in Polish Toruń.  In the late 1930s she taught at several secondary schools, simultaneously working as an instructor for Przysposobienie Wojskowe Kobiet (Women's Military Training). During the 1939 invasion of Poland, she was commandant of the Silesian-district Women's Military Training, participating in the defense of Lwów.

In October 1939 she joined the Silesian branch of Armed Resistance under the nom de guerre "Zelma", which she later changed to "Zo". In late 1940 she was transferred to Warsaw and began performing courier journeys. She was also deputy head of Zagroda, the Home Army's Foreign Communication Department. In February 1943 she traveled across Germany, France, and Spain to Gibraltar, whence she was transported by air to London. In Britain she underwent parachute training, and on 10 September 1943 she dropped into Poland, said to be "the only woman in the history of the Silent Unseen" (disputed, as she had not completed the full training course).

In 1944 Zawacka fought in the Warsaw Uprising, and after its defeat moved to Kraków, where she continued her underground activities. In 1945 she joined the anti-Communist organization Freedom and Independence (WiN), but quit soon afterwards and took up a teaching job.

In 1951 she was arrested and tortured by Urząd Bezpieczeństwa (Security Service of the Ministry of Internal Affairs). She was sentenced to 10 years in prison for treason and espionage, but her sentence was shortened and she was released in 1955. After her release from prison, she earned a doctorate degree from Gdańsk University. She was a tenured professor at the Institute of Pedagogy at Mikołaj Kopernik University in Toruń, where she established the department of Andragogy. She retired from teaching in 1978 after Służba Bezpieczeństwa closed the department. She was an active member of the World Union of Home Army Soldiers and cooperated with Solidarność in the 1980s.

Decorations 
Decorations awarded to Elżbieta Zawacka include:
 Order of the White Eagle (1995)
 Order of Virtuti Militari, Silver Cross, twice
 Cross of Valour 5 times
 Commander's Cross with Star of the Order of Polonia Restituta, also awarded the Officer's Cross
 Gold Cross of Merit with Swords
 Home Army Cross
 Army Medal
 Medal Pro Memoria

Gallery

See also

List of Poles
Maria Wittek

References

External links

Polish generals
Polish female soldiers
Women in European warfare
Polish women in war
1909 births
2009 deaths
Polish centenarians
Home Army members
Home Army officers
Cichociemni
Warsaw Uprising insurgents
Academic staff of Nicolaus Copernicus University in Toruń
People detained by the Polish Ministry of Public Security
Polish Scouts and Guides
Recipients of the Cross of Valour (Poland)
Commanders with Star of the Order of Polonia Restituta
Recipients of the Cross of Merit with Swords (Poland)
Recipients of the Armia Krajowa Cross
Recipients of the Silver Cross of the Virtuti Militari
People from Toruń
20th-century Polish politicians
20th-century Polish women politicians
Recipients of the Order of the White Eagle (Poland)
Women centenarians
Women in World War II